The 25th Arizona State Legislature, consisting of the Arizona State Senate and the Arizona House of Representatives, was constituted in Phoenix from January 1, 1961, to December 31, 1962, during the second of three terms of Paul Fannin's time as Governor of Arizona. The number of senators remained constant at two per county, totaling 28, and the members of the house of representatives also held steady at 80. The Republicans picked up three seats in the upper house, but the Democrats still had a 24–4 edge.   In the House the Republicans picked up two seats, leaving the Democrats with a 52–28 edge.

Sessions
The Legislature met for two regular sessions at the State Capitol in Phoenix. The first opened on January 9, 1961, and adjourned on March 24; while the second convened on January 8, 1962, and adjourned on March 22. There was a single Special Session, which convened on July 17, 1961, and adjourned sine die on July 31.

State Senate

Members

The asterisk (*) denotes members of the previous Legislature who continued in office as members of this Legislature.

House of Representatives

Members 
The asterisk (*) denotes members of the previous Legislature who continued in office as members of this Legislature.

References

Arizona legislative sessions
1961 in Arizona
1962 in Arizona
1961 U.S. legislative sessions
1962 U.S. legislative sessions